Bruno Dubeux de Andrade (born February 8, 1981), best known as Bruno Dubeux, is an American-born Brazilian actor and doctor.

Biography 
Bruno Dubeux was born in Bryan, Texas to Brazilian parents. He is a member of the traditional Burle Dubeux family, a Pernambucan family of French descent. When he was born, his parents were university students and they were in the United States. He left his hometown of Bryan, Texas, only 3 months old when his parents returned to Recife, Pernambuco.

He holds a degree in Medicine from the Federal University of Pernambuco with a postgraduate degree in pediatrics at the University of Porto and a year of internship at the Harvard Medical School and a degree in Performing Arts from UniverCidade.

Filmography

Television

Film

References

External links 
 

1981 births
Living people
Male actors from Bryan, Texas
American people of Brazilian descent
American people of French descent
American emigrants to Brazil
Brazilian male film actors
Brazilian pediatricians
Federal University of Pernambuco alumni
University of Porto alumni
Harvard Medical School alumni
People from Recife